Antinaco may refer to:
 Antinaco, Catamarca, Argentina
 Antinaco, La Rioja, Argentina